Roberto Gavaldón (June 7, 1909 in Jiménez, Chihuahua – September 4, 1986 in Mexico City) was a Mexican film director.

Eight of Gavaldón's films were featured on the list 100 Best Movies of the Cinema of Mexico. His 1958 film Ash Wednesday was entered into the 8th Berlin International Film Festival and his 1959 film Beyond All Limits was entered into the following years festival. His 1960 film Macario was entered into the 1960 Cannes Film Festival and was nominated for an Academy Award for Best Foreign Language Film.

Selected filmography
 The Count of Monte Cristo (1942)
 La Barraca (1944)
 The Shack (1945)
 The Associate (1946)
 La Otra (1946)
 The Private Life of Mark Antony and Cleopatra (1947)
 Adventures of Casanova (1948)
 La casa chica (1950)
 Desired (1951)
 En La Palma de Tu Mano (1951)
 La Noche Avanza (1952)
 The Boy and the Fog (1953)
 Las Tres perfectas casadas (1953)
 Camelia (1954)
 El Rebozo de Soledad (1953)
 After the Storm (1955)
 The Littlest Outlaw (1955)
 Sombra Verde (1955)
 The Hidden One (1956)
 Ash Wednesday (1958)
 Beyond All Limits (1959)
 Macario (1960)
 Rosa Blanca (1961)
 Autumn Days (1963)
 El Gallo de Oro (1964)
 El hombre de los hongos (1976)
 La Playa vacia (1979)

References

External links

1909 births
1986 deaths
Best Director Ariel Award winners
Golden Age of Mexican cinema
Mexican film directors
People from Chihuahua (state)